Armindo Lopes Coelho (December 16, 1931 – September 29, 2010) was the Roman Catholic bishop of the Roman Catholic Diocese of Porto, Portugal.

Ordained to the priesthood on August 1, 1954, Lopes Coelho was appointed auxiliary bishop of the Porto Diocese on November 16, 1978, and was consecrated on March 25, 1978. On June 13, 1997, he was appointed diocesan bishop of the Porto Diocese retiring on February 22, 2007.

Notes

20th-century Roman Catholic bishops in Portugal
21st-century Roman Catholic bishops in Portugal
1931 births
2010 deaths
Bishops of Porto